Toti Sport is a Hungarian sports clothing brand.

Sponsorships
The following teams wear uniforms and apparel manufactured by TOTI:

Football
 Szentlőrinci AC

Basketball
Associations
 Hungarian Basketball Federation (Official Referee Kits)

Club teams

 ELTE BEAC
 Ceglédi EKK
 Sopron Basket
 PINKK-Pécsi 424
 Szedeák
 KSC Szekszárd
 Vasas Akadémia

Handball
 Csepel DSE
 Euronovex USE

Boxing

 Hungarian Boxing Association
 MTK Budapest
 Vecsés

References

External links
 
 

Hungarian brands
Sportswear brands
Clothing companies of Hungary
Clothing companies established in 1989
1989 establishments in Hungary